Niall Ahern (born 1968) is an Irish former hurler. At club level he played with Sarsfields and at inter-county level was a member of the Cork senior hurling team. Ahern usually lined out as a forward.

Career

Ahern first played hurling and Gaelic football at juvenile and underage levels with the Sarsfields and Glanmire clubs. He simultaneously lined out as a schoolboy with Coláiste an Chroí Naofa in Carrignavar and won an All-Ireland Colleges medal in 1985. He subsequently won Fitzgibbon Cup titles as a student with University College Cork. After being part of the Glanmire team that won the 1987 Cork IFC title, Ahern was on the Sarsfields senior team that lost county finals to Glen Rovers in 1989 and Imokilly in 1997. Ahern first appeared on the inter-county scene as a member of the Cork under-21 hurling team in 1989. He was later drafted onto the senior team during the 1989-90 NHL.

Career statistics

Honours

Coláiste an Chroí Naofa
All-Ireland Colleges Senior B Football Championship: 1985
Munster Colleges Senior B Football Championship: 1985

University College Cork
Fitzgibbon Cup: 1990, 1991
All-Ireland Freshers' Hurling Championship: 1987

Glanmire
Cork Intermediate Football Championship: 1987

References

1968 births
Living people
Cork inter-county hurlers
Glanmire Gaelic footballers
Heads of schools in Ireland
Sarsfields (Cork) hurlers
UCC hurlers